Pinlon may refer to several places in Burma:

Pinlon, Banmauk
Pinlon, Kale
Panglong, Southern Shan State, also known as Pinlon